Michael Bahir Maschler (July 22, 1927 – July 20, 2008) was an Israeli mathematician well known for his contributions to the field of game theory. He was a professor in the Einstein Institute of Mathematics and the Center for the Study of Rationality at the Hebrew University of Jerusalem in Israel. In 2012, the Israeli Chapter of the Game Theory Society founded the Maschler Prize, an annual prize awarded to an outstanding research student in game theory and related topics in Israel.

References

External links
 Michael Maschler: In Memoriam
Discussion paper #493 of the Center for the Study of Rationality at the Hebrew University of Jerusalem. This paper contains reminiscences about Michael Maschler and overviews of his work and contribution to Game Theory and Mathematics pedagogy by Robert J. Aumann, Ein-Ya Gura, Sergiu Hart, Bezalel Peleg, Hana Shemesh, and Shmuel Zamir. The paper also includes a complete list of Maschler's English and Hebrew publications.
 Michael Maschler at the Mathematics Genealogy Project 
 https://web.archive.org/web/20080515212415/http://cepa.newschool.edu/het/profiles/maschler.htm
 Biography of Michael Maschler from the Institute for Operations Research and the Management Sciences
  Essays in Game Theory: in Honor of Michael Maschler

Selected publications
For a complete list of English and Hebrew publication, see Michael Maschler: In Memoriam, above.
 "The Bargaining Set for Cooperative Games", with R.J. Aumann, 1964, in Advances in Game Theory 
 "The Core of a Cooperative Game", with M. Davis, 1965, Naval Research Logistics Quarterly 
 "Game-Theoretic Aspects of Gradual Disarmament", with R.J. Aumann, 1966, Mathematica 
 "Some Thoughts on the Minimax Principle" with R.J. Aumann, 1972, Management Science 
 "An Advantage of the Bargaining Set over the Core", 1976, JET 
 "Geometric Properties of the Kernel, Nucleolus and Related Solution Concepts", with B. Peleg and L.S. Shapley, 1979, Mathematics of Operations Research 
 "Superadditive Solution for the Nash bargaining Game", with M. Perles, 1981, IJGT 
 "Game Theoretic Analysis of a Bankruptcy Problem from the Talmud", with R.J. Aumann, 1985, JET 
 "The Consistent Shapley Value for Hyperplane Games", with G. Owen, 1989, IJGT 
 "The Consistent Shapley Value for Games without Side Payments", with G. Owen, 1992, in Selten, editor, Rational Interaction 
 "The Bargaining Set, Kernel and Nucleolus", 1992, in Aumann and Hart, editors, Handbook of Game Theory
 Repeated Games with Incomplete Information, MIT Press, Cambridge, 1995, with R.J. Aumann
 Insights into Game Theory: An Alternative Mathematical Experience, Cambridge University Press, forthcoming, with Ein-Ya Gura

1927 births
2008 deaths
Fellows of the Econometric Society
Game theorists
Academic staff of the Hebrew University of Jerusalem
Israeli Jews
Israeli mathematicians
Jewish scientists